The men's marathon at the 2015 IPC Athletics World Championships was held in the streets of London on 26 April as part of the 2015 London Marathon.

Classification
Athletes were given a classification depending on the type and extent of their disability. The classification system allowed athletes to compete against others with a similar level of function.

The athletics classifications are:
11–13: Blind (11) and visually impaired (12, 13) athletes
31–38: Athletes with cerebral palsy
51–58: Athletes with a spinal cord disability

The class numbers were given prefixes of "T", "F" and "P" for track, field and pentathlon events, respectively.

Visually impaired athletes classified 11 run with full eye shades and a guide runner; those classified 12 have the option of using a guide; those classified 13 did not use a guide runner.

Events

T12
The T12 classification marathon was contested by T12 and T11 athletes. Up to two guide runners were allowed to support each competitor.

T13

T46
The T46 classification marathon was contested by T46 and T45 athletes.

T52
The T52 classification marathon was contested by T52 and T51 athletes.

T54

The T54 classification marathon was contested by T54 and T53 athletes.

See also
List of IPC world records in athletics

References

Marathon
London Marathon
Ipc
Marathons at the World Para Athletics Championships